Papilio fuelleborni is a species of swallowtail butterfly from the genus Papilio that is found in Tanzania and Malawi.

The larvae feed on Clausena species.

Description
The male is deep black, with a pure white median band, very narrow in forewing, very wide in hindwing. The female is similar to other species of the group but with large white spots on the hindwing, placed at the margin (Carcasson, 1960).

Subspecies
Papilio fuelleborni fuelleborni (eastern and southern Tanzania, northern Malawi)
Papilio fuelleborni sjoestedti Aurivillius, 1908 (northern Tanzania)
Papilio fuelleborni atavus Le Cerf, 1912  (northern Tanzania)
Papilio fuelleborni rydoni Kielland, 1987  (north-eastern Tanzania)

Taxonomy

Papilio fuelleborni is a member of the echerioides species-group. This clade includes

Papilio echerioides Trimen, 1868
Papilio fuelleborni Karsch, 1900
Papilio jacksoni Sharpe, 1891 
Papilio sjoestedti Aurivillius, 1908

See also
Friedrich Fülleborn

References

Carcasson, R.H 1960 The Swallowtail Butterflies of East Africa (Lepidoptera,Papilionidae). Journal of the  East Africa Natural History Society pdf Key to East Africa members of the species group, diagnostic and other notes and figures. (Permission to host granted by The East Africa Natural History Society

fuelleborni
Butterflies described in 1900
Butterflies of Africa
Taxa named by Ferdinand Karsch